Words and Phrases Legally Defined is a law dictionary. It contains statutory and judicial definitions of words and phrases. It is one of the two "major" dictionaries of its type (the other being Stroud's). Both dictionaries have entries not contained in the other. This dictionary is "useful".

The second edition was edited by John B. Saunders and published by Butterworths in five volumes from 1969 to 1970.

References
Saunders, John B. Words and Phrases Legally Defined; 3rd ed. London:  Butterworths . 1988 - 1990. Volumes 1, 2, and 4. Snippet view from Google Books.
Saunders, John B (general editor). Words and Phrases Legally Defined. Second Edition. Butterworths. London. 1969 - 1970. SBN 406 08030 5 (for the complete set). Volumes 1, 2, 3, 4 and 5. Snippet view from Google Books.
Robert Watts and Francis Johns. Concise Legal Research. Sixth Edition. The Federation Press. Page 118. Google Books.
Jill Cottrell. Legal Research: A Guide for Hong Kong Students. Hong Kong University Press. 1997. . Page 121. Google Books.
"Book Notices" (1970) 33 Modern Law Review 476. JSTOR.

Law dictionaries